Hiq (also Romanized as Hīq) is a village in Khanamrud Rural District, in the Central District of Heris County, East Azerbaijan Province, Iran. At the 2006 census, its population was 292, in 65 families.

References 

Populated places in Heris County